Rebel Planet is a role-playing video game published by Adventure Soft in 1985 for the Acorn Electron, Amstrad CPC, BBC Micro, Commodore 64, and ZX Spectrum.

Gameplay
Rebel Planet is an adaptation of the Fighting Fantasy gamebook, Rebel Planet.

Reception
Zzap!64 reviewed the game, rating it 52% overall, and stated that "Rebel Planet is a fairly standard effort ... The graphics are pleasantly drawn as well so those who don't have the necessary imagination to view their surroundings in adventure games should not be disappointed. Those who are more interested in the flexibility of the plot and interactive capability of the game may be."

Reviews
Computer and Video Games (May, 1986)
Aktueller Software Markt	(Jun, 1986)
Computer Gamer (Oct, 1986)
Crash! (Aug, 1986)
Sinclair User (Aug, 1986)
Your Sinclair (Sep, 1986)
Amtix! (Nov, 1986)

References

1985 video games
Adventure Soft games
Amstrad CPC games
BBC Micro and Acorn Electron games
Commodore 64 games
Single-player video games
Video games based on novels
Video games developed in the United Kingdom
Video games set on fictional planets
ZX Spectrum games